Hangzhou Zhongce Rubber Co., Ltd. is China's largest manufacturer of automotive tyres. The company began as Hangzhou Rubber Factory in 1958. In 2011 it was the tenth largest tyre maker in the world, with $4.26 billion worth of sales.

Hangzhou Zhongce manufactures a variety of tyres for cars, trucks, motorcycles, scooters, bicycles, tractors, ATVs and other vehicles. Tyre brands produced by the company include
Chaoyang, 
Goodride, 
Westlake, 
Arisun and 
Trazano.

In 2015, Zenises announced the launch of its new Westlake retail network in Spain and Portugal.

References

External links
English language website
Hangzhou Rubber Factory Timeline
Goodride US site
Goodride UK site
Westlake Australia site
Russia site
Polish site

Automotive companies of China
Tire manufacturers of China
Manufacturing companies based in Hangzhou
Manufacturing companies established in 1958
Chinese brands
1958 establishments in China